The Altorfer Bros. Company was a washing machine manufacturer founded by brothers A.W. and Silas Altorfer in Roanoke, Illinois, in 1909.

The brothers first created a power clothes washer after watching their sisters and mother hand-washing piles of clothes.  It was basically a wooden tub mounted to a bench with wooden "fingers" to wash the clothes, and attached to a gasoline engine.  After two years, sales of the new power washer were in the thousands.  They called the machine the Roanoke Power Machine.

The company became known as the ABC Washer Company and its appliances were sold under the ABC brand.  The company built a new factory in Peoria, Illinois, and the wooden tub was replaced with a metal tub.  In 1926, ABC produced the first porcelain-lined tub.  In 1928, ABC took over the Federal Washing Machine Company of Chicago, Illinois, which was producing washing machines for the Insull utilities company founded by Samuel Insull.  ABC became Insull's supplier and made washing machines under the Fedelco brand exclusively for them. In the mid-nineteen thirties ABC introduced a spin dryer model which eliminated the wringer and added a spin dryer to the conventional washing model.

In 1952, Altorfer Bros. Company was purchased by the Nash-Kelvinator company, and began manufacturing products under the Kelvinator brand as well.

References

Manufacturing companies established in 1909
American Motors
Nash Motors
Home appliance manufacturers of the United States
Defunct companies based in Illinois
Peoria, Illinois 
Companies based in Woodford County, Illinois
1909 establishments in Illinois
Manufacturing companies disestablished in 1952
1952 disestablishments in Illinois